General Sir Lewis Stratford Tollemache Halliday,  (14 May 1870 – 9 March 1966) was an English Royal Marine officer and a recipient of the Victoria Cross, the highest award for gallantry in the face of the enemy that can be awarded to British and Commonwealth forces.

Early life
Halliday was born in Medstead, Hampshire on 14 May 1870. He was commissioned into the Royal Marines in 1889.

Victoria Cross
Halliday was 30 years old, and a captain in the Royal Marine Light Infantry, during the Boxer Rebellion in China when the following deed took place for which he was awarded the VC.

On 24 June 1900 at Peking, China, an attack was made on the British Legation by the Boxers who set fire to the stables and occupied some of the other buildings. It being imperative to drive the enemy out, a hole was knocked in the Legation wall and 20 men of the RMLI went in. Captain Halliday, leading a party of six men, was involved in desperate fighting and was severely wounded but despite his injuries, he killed four of the enemy. Finally, unable to carry on any further, he ordered his men to go on without him, after which he returned to the legation alone, telling his men 'carry on and not mind him', so as not to diminish the number of men engaged in the sortie. He walked 100 yards unaided to the hospital although his shoulder was half blown out and his left lung punctured.

His citation reads:

He was promoted to brevet major for his part in the legation's defence, and returned to the United Kingdom to receive the VC from King Edward VII during an investiture at Marlborough House on 25 July 1901.

Later service
Having recovered from his wound he returned to duty at the end of 1901. He commanded the Marine detachment aboard , and then commanded the Marines aboard , the flagship of the home fleet, from late 1902. In 1907 having completed staff college at Camberley, he was appointed staff officer to the Portsmouth Division of his corps. He then commanded a company of Gentleman Officer Cadets at the Royal Military College, Sandhurst for four years during which time he was promoted to major. Among his cadets was the future Field Marshal Earl Alexander of Tunis. In early 1915 he was promoted to brevet lieutenant colonel and on 14 July of that year he was made lieutenant colonel. In November 1915 he joined GHQ, Home Forces as General Staff Officer. He was appointed colonel second Commandant of the Royal Marine Light Infantry in 1920 and colonel commandant on 1 January 1923. Halliday was promoted to major general on 11 December 1925, to lieutenant general on 11 June 1927 and to general on 1 October 1928. He served as ADC to King George V in 1924 and 1925, and he held the post of Adjutant-General Royal Marines from December 1927 until his voluntary retirement in June 1930. He was invested as a Companion of the Order of the Bath on 3 June 1913, he was elevated as a Knight Commander of the Order of the Bath on 1 January 1930.

The medal
His Victoria Cross is displayed at the Royal Marines Museum in Southsea, England.

References

External links
 Location of grave and VC medal (Surrey)

|-

1870 births
1966 deaths
Academics of the Royal Military College, Sandhurst
Royal Marines generals
British military personnel of the Boxer Rebellion
British recipients of the Victoria Cross
Knights Commander of the Order of the Bath
People educated at Elizabeth College, Guernsey
Royal Navy recipients of the Victoria Cross
Royal Marines personnel of World War I
Deputy Lieutenants of Devon
People from Medstead
Military personnel from Hampshire